Henry John Bate (19 April 1881 – 4 January 1967) was an Australian politician.

Born at Tilba Tilba to farmer Richard Mossop Bate and Henrietta Higman, he was educated at Newington College (1897–1899), Sydney Technical and Hawkesbury Agricultural Colleges before becoming a farmer. On 2 May 1905 he married Lily Percival, with whom he had two sons; he would later remarry Elise May Mead on 23 May 1918. In 1910 he was elected to Eurobodalla Shire Council, serving until 1913 and again from 1917 to 1928. In 1926 he was elected to the New South Wales Legislative Assembly as the Nationalist member for Goulburn, transferring to South Coast in 1927. In 1931 he joined the United Australia Party. Bate served until 1941, and died in Bega in 1967.

His son, Jeff Bate, and his daughters-in-law, Thelma Bate and Zara Bate add to the political notability of the Bate family.

References

1881 births
1967 deaths
Nationalist Party of Australia members of the Parliament of New South Wales
United Australia Party members of the Parliament of New South Wales
Members of the New South Wales Legislative Assembly
Australian farmers
People educated at Newington College
20th-century Australian politicians